The Judge in charge of the Constitutional and Administrative Law List of the Court of First Instance (within the High Court) of Hong Kong, is the most important Law List in that court, given the far-reaching powers of interpreting the Hong Kong Basic Law. As such, the Judge in charge of this list is often considered to be the top judge of the lower court.

Description

The list receives a material public interest in Hong Kong due to the fact that it is the first point of contact for most contentious court cases around issues that have caused public discussion or social unrest, including being in charge of all judicial reviews. These include cases around the Legislative Council oath-taking controversy, the Umbrella Movement, and the 2019–20 Hong Kong protests. In addition, given the important nature of this position, the Judge entrusted with this role is often almost guaranteed to be elevated to the higher courts in the future. 

So far, all Judges in this role have been promoted to at least the Court of Appeal, with many elevated to the Court of Final Appeal. Current justices of the Court of Final Appeal who were once the Judge in charge of this list include Chief Justice Andrew Cheung, permanent judge Johnson Lam and non-permanent justice Frank Stock. Former justices include Michael Hartmann.

List of Judges

References 

Law of Hong Kong
Hong Kong judges